Millton is a surname. Notable people with the surname include:

 Edward Millton (1861–1942), New Zealand rugby union player
 William Millton (1858–1887), New Zealand rugby union player and cricketer

See also
 Milton (surname)